Mt. Airy Arboretum, is an arboretum set within Mt. Airy Forest (1,470 acres), a public park located at 5083 Colerain Avenue, Cincinnati, Ohio. It is open daily without charge.

The arboretum began in 1911 when the Cincinnati Park Board purchased  of land for reforestation and conservation.

The arboretum includes more than 5,000 plants representing 1,600 species and varieties of woody plants. It contains one of the finest dwarf conifer collection in the Midwest, set around a  pond. Other collections include ash, azalea, birch, beech, buckeye, cherry, crabapple, deutzia, dogwood, elm, euonymus, fir, hawthorn, hemlock, juniper, lilac, magnolia, maple, oak, poplar, spruce, viburnum, willow, and yew.

External links
Mt. Airy Forest

See also 
 List of botanical gardens in the United States

Arboreta in Ohio
Botanical gardens in Ohio
Parks in Cincinnati
Protected areas of Hamilton County, Ohio